Ranunculus platanifolius, the large white buttercup, is a species of perennial herb of the buttercup family (Ranunculaceae) growing in mountains of Europe.

Description
The large white buttercup is an herbaceous plant 30 – 100 cm tall, with glabrous stem with many branches.

The leaves are palmate, each divided into five segments with dentate margin.
Flowers are organized into cymes; each flower has a calyx with five sepals, a corolla with five white petals, many stamens with yellow anthers and many styles.

Fruits are hooked achenes.

Distribution and habitat
This plant lives in mountain woods and forests of Europe, from 800 to 2000 m above sea level.

Toxicity
As other Ranunculaceae, this plant is toxic because it contains anemonin.

References

platanifolius